"Troublemaker" is a song recorded by Japanese boy band Arashi. It was released on March 3, 2010 by their record label J Storm. "Troublemaker" was used as the theme song to the drama  starring Arashi member Sho Sakurai. It was released as a CD single in two formats: a regular edition containing with two B-sides and the instrumental of all the songs and a limited edition containing the B-side  and a DVD.

Single information
On January 5, 2010, it was announced that Arashi would provide the song "Yurase, Ima o" as the theme song for the 2010 Winter Olympics news coverage on NTV. This was the group's third theme song for the NTV Olympic coverage, the previous two being "Hero" in 2004, and "Kaze no Mukō e" in 2008. The next day on January 6, 2010, Sakurai announced that Arashi would provide the theme song "Troublemaker" for his then-upcoming comedy drama during the drama's press conference.

Chart performance
On the day of the single's release, it debuted at number-one the Oricon daily singles chart by selling about 232,000 copies. On the Oricon weekly singles chart, the single debuted at number-one and sold about 542,000 copies, making Arashi the first group to have their weekly singles sales exceed 500,000 for two consecutive years since B'z in 2001.

On June 24, 2010, "Troublemaker" placed at number-one on the Oricon first half of the year singles chart by selling 688,194 copies in the end of the year. According to Oricon, "Troublemaker" is the third best-selling single of 2010 in Japan.

Live performances
On February 12, 2010, Arashi performed "Troublemaker" and "Yurase, Ima o" on Music Station's 1000th Episode Special. However, because of his work as the special newscaster for the Olympics news coverage on NTV, Sakurai could not attend the live music show as he had to go to Vancouver for the opening ceremony. Having finished his work with the Olympics, Sakurai performed "Troublemaker" with the other members of Arashi when they once again went on Music Station on March 5, 2010.

Track listing

Charts and certifications

Weekly charts

Year-end charts

Certifications

Release history

References

External links
"Troublemaker" product information 
"Troublemaker" Oricon profile 

2010 singles
Arashi songs
Billboard Japan Hot 100 number-one singles
Oricon Weekly number-one singles
Japanese television drama theme songs
J Storm singles
2010 songs